Józef Michalik (born April 20, 1941, in Zambrów) is a Polish Roman Catholic bishop, the diocesan Bishop of the Zielona Góra-Gorzów diocese in 1986-1993 (to 1992 of Gorzów), Archbishop of Przemyśl in 1993–2016, and the President of the Polish Episcopal Conference in 2004–2014.

Biography
In the years 1958–1964, he studied at a Seminary in Łomża where he was ordained a priest on May 23, 1964. He studied dogmatic theology at Warsaw Theological Academy and later at the Pontifical University of St. Thomas Aquinas (Angelicum) in Rome, where in 1972, he received a doctorate in theology. In 1973, he was appointed vice-chancellor of the diocesan curia in Łomża. In October 1985, he became head of the Office of Youth Affairs at the Pontifical Council for the Laity.

On October 1, 1986, he was appointed bishop of the diocese of Gorzów. On October 16, 1986, in the Vatican he was ordained as bishop by Pope John Paul II. On March 25, 1992, after the reorganization of structures of the dioceses in Poland, Michalik was appointed the first diocesan bishop of the Diocese of Zielona Góra-Gorzów.

On April 17, 1993, he was appointed Archbishop of Przemyśl the Latin rite. On May 2, 1993, he made an ingres (ingressus) at the Cathedral of Przemyśl.

In the Polish Episcopal Conference for 10 years Michalik served as: Chairman of the Committee for the Pastoral Care of the Academic Vice-president of the Commission for the Pastoral Care of the General and President of the Commission for the Pastoral Care of the Laity. Is chairman of the CEP for Polonia and Poles Abroad. In 1999, he was deputy chairman of the Polish Episcopal Conference. March 18, 2004 elected chairman of the Polish Episcopal Conference, re-elected for a second term March 10, 2009.

In 1994, he was elected chairman of the Commission for the Laity in the Council of European Episcopal Conferences (CCEE). September 30, 2011 at the plenary meeting of the Council of Episcopal Conferences of Europe (CCEE) in Tirana has been elected Vice-president CCEE.

Since 1990, a consultor of the Pontifical Council for the Laity, and a member of the Congregation for Bishops.

In 2002, he was awarded the Polonia Mater Nostra Est.

The changes in approach taken by Pope Francis, with calls for tolerance of homosexuals and for Church officials to adopt a more humble lifestyle, have caused some difficulty between the media and the conservative Polish Church. In a sermon in 2013 at Jasna Góra Monastery Michalik said "All the anti-Church media try to persuade us that the main theme of Pope Francis’s pronouncements is the wealth of the Church ... They obviously want to use the Pope to battle the Church."

He often appears on Radio Maryja and the diocesan radio station Radio Parish Church of the Archdiocese of Przemysl. He is a regular feature writer of the Catholic weekly magazine "Friday".

Controversies
In 2009, Michalik was linked to case of relegation of a policeman who gave him a speeding ticket.

On February 15, 2007, Michalik, in an interview with Polish TV, Polish Press Agency PAP, IAR and the IAC, has reported that the Church Historical Commission on the basis of materials established by the Institute of National Remembrance IPN found that during the years 1975 to 1978 he was registered as an agent of the Communist secret police (SB) codenamed "Zephyr". The commission on the basis of available materials also recognized that there is no basis to determine the nature of his actual work.

In 2013, responding to reports of a succession of child sex abuse scandals, Michalik said "Often that inappropriate approach or abuse is released when the child is looking for love. It clings, it seeks. It loses itself and also draws in that second person." This comment was heavily criticised, and Michalik  called a news conference to apologise, stating that he did not blame children who were victims of abuse.

In October 2013 Michalik's online biography was discovered to contain an incorrect claim of an award granted by Cambridge University.

References

External links

Catholic Hierarchy page

21st-century Roman Catholic archbishops in Poland
1941 births
Cardinal Stefan Wyszyński University in Warsaw alumni
Living people
Roman Catholic bishops of Przemyśl
People from Zambrów
20th-century Roman Catholic archbishops in Poland